The Chakma people (Burmese: သက္ကမ,ဒိုင်းနက်လူမျို), are an ethnic group from the eastern-most regions of the Indian subcontinent. They are the largest ethnic group in the Chittagong Hill Tracts region of southeastern Bangladesh, and the second-largest in Mizoram, India (Chakma Autonomous District). Other places in Northeast India also have significant Chakma populations. Around 60,000 Chakma people live in Arunachal Pradesh, India; a first generation migrated there in 1964 after the construction of the Kaptai Dam forced them off their lands. Another 79,000 Chakmas live in Tripura, India, and 20,000-30,000 in Assam, India.

The Chakma possess strong ethnic affinities to Tibeto-Burman groups in Northeast India. Because of a language shift in the past to consolidate power among the tribes, they adopted an Indo-Aryan language, Chakma, which is closely related to the Chittagonian dialect of Bengali, predominant near the areas in which they live. Most modern Chakma people practice Theravada Buddhism, due to 19th-century reforms and institutionalization by Queen regnant Rani Kalindi. In Myanmar, Chakma people are known as Daingnet and are one of the 135 officially recongised ethnic groups there.

The Chakmas are divided into 31 clans or gozas. The community is headed by the Chakma Raja, whose status as a tribal head has been historically recognized by the Government of British India and the Government of Bangladesh.1

The relationships between Chakmas and their neighbors are complex. On one hand, many Chakmas are well-integrated in mainstream middle-class Bangladeshi and Indian society and are particularly notable for their service as officers and ambassadors in Bangladesh's military and diplomatic corps. Chakma politicians have served as ministers in the national ministry of Bangladesh and the state ministry of Tripura. However, the persecution of the indigenous tribes of the Chittagong Hill Tracts, of which the Chakma are the predominant ethnicity, has been described as genocidal, but since the Chittagong Hill Tracts Peace Accord, violence in the area has been greatly reduced.

Etymology
The name Chakma derives from the Sanskrit word sakthimaha, which means powerful and great. The name was given to the Chakmas by one of the Burmese kings during the Bagan Era. Burmese kings hired Chakmas as ministers, advisers, and translators of Buddhist Pali texts. As employees of the king, the Chakmas wielded power in the Burmese court that was disproportionate to their number. The Burmese people still refer to Chakmas as Sak (သက်) or Thet, which are shortened and corrupted forms of Sakthimaha. At one point, the most commonly accepted name of the tribe was Sakma. Later, when they came into contact with outsiders, the name was further changed to Chakma.

History
Chakma oral history says they migrated to Arakan from the ancient kingdom of Magadha in the present Bihar state of India. The Chakma believe they are part of Buddha's Sakya clan of the Himalayan tribes. They gradually migrated to Arakan and extended their territory to the nearby hills of the Chittagong Hill Tracts.

The Arakanese people referred to the Chakmas as Saks, Theks, or Thaikhs. In 1546 CE, while the Arakanese king Min Bin was fighting a battle with the Burmese, the Sak king attacked Northern Arakan Roma and occupied the Arakanese-controlled Chacomas of the Northern Arakan Mountains.

Diego de Astor created a map of Bengal, which was published as Descripção do Reino de Bengalla in the book Quarta decada da Asia (Fourth decade of Asia) by João de Barros in 1615. The map shows an area named Chacomas on the Eastern bank of the Karnaphuli River in what is now Chittagong Bangladesh, suggesting that the Chakmas inhabited this area during the time.

The Arakan king Min Razagyi (1593–1612) conquered the areas and styled himself as the highest and most powerful king of Arakan, Chacomas, and Bengal in a 1607 letter to Portuguese mercenary Filipe de Brito e Nicote. After their defeat by the Arakanese, the Chakmas migrated to the present Chittagong Hill Tracts and founded their capital city Alekyangdong (present-day Alikadam). From Alekyangdong, they continued north and settled in present-day Rangunia, Raozan, and Fatikchari Upazilas of Chittagong District.

In 1666, the Mughal Governor of Bengal, Shaista Khan, defeated the Arakanese, conquered Chittagong, and renamed it Islamabad. Mughal rule, however, was confined to the plain areas of Chittagong early on, leaving the Chakmas largely unaffected. The Mughals eventually demanded tribute from the Chakmas after a trade dispute developed between the two groups.

In 1713, the conflict was resolved and a stable relationship developed between the Chakmas and the Mughals; the latter never demanded complete subjugation of the former. The Mughals also rewarded the Chakma king Shukdev Roy; he established a new capital in his name in an area still known as Shukbilash. Ruins of the royal palace and other historic buildings still exist. Subsequently, the capital was shifted to Rajanagar, Ranirhat, Rangunia Upazila, Chittagong District.

The Mughals signed a treaty with Jallal Khan, Raja of the Chakma, in 1715. While the Mughals controlled significant amounts of yam and cotton crops in the Chittagong Hill Tracts (CHT), the Chakma's independence from the Mughals was recognized.

The East India Company 
Three years after the Battle of Plassey, Mir Qasim, the new Nawab of Murshidabad, rewarded the East India Company with Chittagong, Burdwan and Midnapur. On 5 January 1761, company representative Harry Verelst took charge of Chittagong from Subedar Mohammad Reza Khan, but the Chakma king Sher Doulat Khan, who was practically independent though nominally paid tribute to the Mughals, did not accept the hegemony of the company and its demand for increased taxes.

Encroachments on the Chittagong Hill Tracts by the British led to a protracted war between the East India Company and the Chakmas from 1777 to 1787. The East India Company launched four offensives against the Chakmas in 1770, 1780, 1782 and 1785. In 1785, the Company started peace negotiations with the Chakma king Jan Baksh Khan, son of Sher Doulat Khan. In 1787 a peace treaty was signed in Calcutta. Raja Jan Baksh Khan pledged loyalty to the British in exchange for autonomy in administering Chakma territory.

The main provisions of the treaty between Governor-General Lord Cornwallis and the Chakma king were as follows:
 The East India Company recognised Jan Baksh Khan as the Raja of the Chakmas
 It was agreed that revenue collection was the responsibility of the Raja
 The British Government would preserve tribal autonomy and migration from the plains would be restricted
 Jan Baksh Khan was bound by the treaty to maintain peace in his territory
 British troops would remain in the Chakma territory, not to terrify the Chakmas but to protect the land from hostile tribes

In 1829, Halhed, then Commissioner of Chittagong, reaffirmed that:

Jan Baksh Khan shifted his capital to a new place near present-day Rangunia, naming it Rajanagar. After Jan Baksh's death in 1800, his son Tabbar Khan became king but died shortly after. In 1802, Tabbar Khan's younger brother Jabbar Khan became king and ruled for ten years. After his death, his son Dharam Baksh Khan became king in 1812 and ruled until his death in 1832. Without any male heir, the government appointed Suklal Dewan as manager. Rani Kalindi, the widow of Dharam Baksh Khan, applied to the government to allow her to run state affairs. The government accepted her application and in 1844 issued an order to that effect. In 1846, the annual revenue payable to the company was reset to 11,803.00Rs.

After the great Sepoy Mutiny in 1857, the British government assumed direct control of the administration of India, including the Chittagong Hill Tracts, which were not yet formally separated from Chittagong, from the East India Company. The territorial jurisdiction of the Chakma Raja, however, was fixed by a proclamation dated 6th Shraavana 1170M.S (1763 CE) by the company as "All the hills from the Feni River to the Sangoo and from Nizampur Road in Chittagong to the hills of Kooki Raja".

After Rani Kalindi's death in 1873, her grandson Harish Chandra became the Chakma Raja and was vested with the title Roy Bahadur.

British colonial rule 

After the war with the British, the Chakmas became very weak militarily. The Lushai used to make frequent raids on British subjects because their hunting ground was converted to tea gardens by the British in Cachar, Noakhali, Comilla, and other neighbouring tracts under Rani Kalindi. They raided the Chittagong Hill Tracts and the neighbouring tracts in 1847, 1848, 1859 and 1860. As a consequence, with a view to paying attention to the areas experiencing repeated raids and to protecting the people from the aggression of the independent tribes living further east but primarily to occupy the Chakma land, the Lieutenant Governor of Bengal recommended the removal of the hill tracts from the regulation district and the appointment of a superintendent over the tribes. Both of these recommendations were adopted by Act XXII in 1860, which came into effect on 18 August of that year. The Hill Tracts were separated from Chittagong district, a superintendent was appointed for the Chittagong Hill Tracts, and its headquarters were established at Chandraghona. The hills in his charge were henceforth known as the Hill Tracts of the Chittagong. For the next few years, attention focused on preserving peace on the frontier. In 1869, the headquarters were shifted to Rangamati. The official designation of the post of superintendent was changed to Deputy Commissioner and full control of matters about revenue and justice throughout the Hill Tracts was vested in his office.

The frontier situation put pressure on the Chakma chief to shift his capital, and in 1874, he did so, from Rajanagar to Rangamati. At that time, cotton was grown in Chittagong Hill Tracts and was important to the British for their mills, so effective control of the Chittagong Hill Tracts was also important for them.

In 1881, the government divided the Chittagong Hill Tracts into Chakma Circle, Bohmong Circle, and Mong Circle. Each circle was headed by a chief. Chakma circle was headed by a Chakma, Bohmong circle by a Bohmong and the Burmese circle by a Mong. The Chakma circle was centrally located and inhabited mainly by the Chakmas, the Bohmong circle was under the rule of a Bohmong chief of Arakanese extraction, and the Mong circle was also inhabited by Arakanese speaking clans with some Tripura immigrants and headed by another ruler of Arakanese extraction. The division occurred because the British government was not in favour of the power of the Chakma chief, who controlled the hill tribes. Further, the government was increasingly concerned about the political and administrative affairs of the tracts. Hence, they wished to lay the foundation of administration in a restricted manner with the following objectives:
 To supervise the rule of the Chakma chief and curtail some of his powers
 To protect British subjects from the Kuki (the name given to the Lushai by the British)
 To preserve peace in the frontier areas so cotton could be grown and made available for British mills

After the creation of a separate district and the three circles, the Kuki (Lushai) threat to the Chittagong Hill Tracts and other adjoining areas did not stop. The Shendus made occasional raids in the Hill Tracts between 1865 and 1888 and killed many people, including Lt. Steward and his survey party. In 1872, 1,890 military offensives were launched simultaneously into Lushai Hills (Mizoram) from Chittagong district and Burma in collaboration with the governments of Bengal, Assam and Burma, and the whole of the CHT was brought under British control.

Autonomous police forces were created from the Hill Tract tribes in 1881. Tribals complained to Britain after the Hill Tracts experienced attempts at penetration by lowlander Bengali Muslims.

On 1 April 1900, the South and the North Lushai Hills (then a part of the Chittagong Hill Tracts) were merged to form the district of Assam Province with headquarters at Aizawl. The Lushai hills were now the Mizoram state of India.

Later, the British through the Deputy Commissioner took over absolute control in the Chittagong Hill Tracts (including the Chakma circle) after implementation of the Chittagong Hill Tracts manual. The Chittagong Hill Tracts (Lushai Hills) were again designated an "Excluded Area" under the Government of India Act 1935.

Local tribes demanded an independent state for the Chittagong Hill Tract because Bengalis and the tribals did not share a religion, language, or ethnicity, and they asked for their own independent area in the 1930s when the Indian national movement was launched. During World War II, to retain Chakma loyalty in the face of Japanese advances, local British officials guaranteed the tribals that the Chittagong Hill Tracts would be split of separately in the event of Indian independence.

After independence 
In British India, there was a measure of security and protection afforded for the non-Muslim and non-Bengali Chittagong Hill Tract Chakmas and other tribal people. Bengal and Assam did not govern the CHT during this period. Rather the CHT was a distinct administrative unit that enjoyed a large degree of self-rule.

Despite the CHT being 97.2–98.5% non-Muslim, it was given to Pakistan by the Boundary Commission Chairman Sir Cyril Radcliffe in 1947 upon independence. Native Chakmas made up most of the officials except for some British during British India rule. Pakistan received the CHT from Radcliffe after the issue of Punjab districts and the CHT revised boundaries were pushed onto him by Lord Mountbatten on 17 August 1947. The decision by Radcliffe to draw this boundary paved the way for future war, violence and conflict.  The 1956 Pakistani Constitution, which designated the CHT as a "excluded area," kept things as they were. It was the fact that the CHT was governed under a different set of rules since 1900 in order to prevent mainlanders from acquiring ownership of the tribal land. The CHT underwent a significant change when the Pakistani armed forces overthrew the government in 1958 and renamed the protected area "Tribal Area." Finally, the 1962 Constitution was amended in 1963 to repeal the earlier designation, making the CHT accessible to all non-tribals. As a result, Chakmas' jhum cultivation was hampered, and numerous unauthorised settlers invaded this territory. The Bangladeshi Constitution does not refer to any group (inclusive of Bengalis) as indigenous.

As in India's Tripura State, the Chakmas lived in Bangladesh before it gained its independence. Recent migrations of ethnic Bengalis into traditionally Chakma regions of Bangladesh have raised tensions in the Chittagong Hill Tracts. Successive governments have dealt forcefully with Chakma uprisings and finally ended the conflict with the 1997 peace treaty. This force and the construction of Kaptai Dam by the then-Pakistan government in Chakma areas which submerged cultivable lands and displaced thousands, resulted in the migration during 1964–1969 of a large population of Chakmas into Diyun, Arunachal Pradesh.

Many Buddhist Chakmas migrated from East Pakistan (now Bangladesh) to India. Projects for infrastructure development negatively impacted CHT tribals starting in the 1950s. These included the Kaptai Dam hydro-electric project, built in 1959-1963 by the Pakistan government, with the assistance of the United States Agency for International Development, to provide electricity for much of East Pakistan. The project flooded forty percent of the farmland in the Chittagong Hill Tracts and displaced nearly 100,000 Chakmas. About sixty percent were resettled, and forty percent fled to India. Chakmas made up 90% of the 10,000 people whose 54,000 acres of farmland were flooded in 1962 by the Karnafuli power plant and Kaptai Dam. Inept relocation and insufficient compensation were offered to the Chakmas. India used NEFA as a resettlement area for Chakma refugees.

The Chittagong Hill Tracts Chakma population was estimated at 250,000 in 1964. The CHT was described as being hilly, forested, a verdant green landscape filled with fountains of water A deputy commissioner administered the Chittagong Hill Tracts Division under Pakistani rule.

Manabendra Narayan Larma requested autonomy in 1970. Tripura state had to deal with the issue of Chakma families. Agriculture, employment and education are dominated by Chakmas compared to Arunachal natives because they are more skilled and have a higher literacy rate. The issue of returning Chakma refugees from India to Bangladesh was raised in 1995. The hill tribes conflict with Bangladesh caused the exodus of 50,000 Chakmas to India from the Chittagong Hill Tracts. A 1992 deal between India and Bangladesh arranged that Bangladesh would take them back. A March 1997 agreement between Chakma leaders and Bangladesh provided for the repatriation to Bangladesh of Chakma refugees in Tripura. Both East Pakistan's partition and Bangladesh's independence caused an influx into India of Chakma refugees. In the 1960s, hundreds of Muslim families from other parts of East Pakistan were resettled in the Matamuhuri Valley region of Alikadam, Feni Valley regions of Belchari and Tulanchari, and the regions of Lama, Bandarban, and Ramgarh.

Tridev Roy continued to collaborate with Pakistani forces and declined to join the freedom movement of Bangladesh. Pakistani president Yahya Khan assigned a south-east Asian diplomatic post to Tridiv Roy during the war as a reward for his collaboration. Roy chose the Pakistani side, fearing that an independent Bangladesh would likely have democratic rule and he might lose his feudal interests. Pakistan retained his support and allegiance, Roy agreed on 25 March, and in exchange British artillery would refrain from shelling the CHT capital, Rangamati. Roy believed Bangladesh would not award autonomy to CHT and the Chakmas, and earned the enmity of the Awami League by rejecting Sheikh Mujibur Rahman's offer to stand as the Awami League candidate. Autonomy was refused to the CHT tribals. CHT hills people were enrolled as Mujahids and Razakars by the Pakistan army during the Bangladesh Liberation War of 1971.

The Bangladesh government provided financial support for thousands of Bengalis to settle in the tracts. By 1981, a third of the population of the tracts were Bengali migrants. Parbatya Chattagram Jana Samhati Samiti (PCJSS; Chittagong Hill Tracts Peoples Solidarity Association), which was founded by Chakmas, demanded a halt to Bengali settlement, settlers returning lands to CHT natives, and autonomy. On 7 January 1973, Shanti Bahini (Peace Force) was founded as the military army of PCJSS. In an effort to win independence for the Chittagong Hill Tracts, the Shanti Bahini launched guerrilla attacks against the government. Jumma guerillas made up Shanti Bahini forces. The party heads of PCJSS are mostly Chakma because of their 59% literacy rate, which is more than other CHT tribes, so they control the PCJSS.

During the war, most of the Pahadis remained passive, although the Mukti Bahini enrolled some. In 1971, the Pakistan army enrolled CHT hill men. After the war, Tridev Roy maintained his allegiance to Pakistan, which he supported in the war. In 1970, he served as independent in the Parliament of Pakistan while serving as Raja of the Chakma. The Awami League candidate Sheikh Mujibur Rahman lost the election to Roy. Roy was in Southeast Asia when Bangladesh came under Indian army control in December 1971. Bhutto assigned the position of Minorities Affairs Minister to Roy and he helped lobby in the United Nations (UN) for Pakistan after the war. The post of ambassador and tourism were also awarded to Roy. Roy represented Pakistan when it protested at the UN over Bangladesh. Pakistan retained the allegiance of only Nurul Amin and Tridiv Roy among their East Pakistan MPs. Roy refused to join Bangladesh because the hill tracts were not granted autonomy and stayed on Pakistan's side despite Mujib trying to urge Tridiv to quit Pakistan.

Refuge in India 
Meghalaya and Tripura were destinations of Buddhist Chakma refugees fleeing from the war started by plains-dwelling Muslim Bangladeshis settling the CHT, as well as the government of Bangladesh implementing a military police force to expel Chittagong Hill Tracts natives. "The Muslim World" complained about alleged immigration from Bangladesh to Arakan by Buddhists of Magh and Chakma background.

In 1974, the Garo people were stripped of their property by the XLVI Vested and Non-President Property Act by Bangladesh and affected by the 1964 Enemy Property Ordinance. Lands in CHT were taken by Bengali colonists; the hill peoples of the CHT were not afforded any cultural or ethnic recognition, and sympathy from successive Bangladesh governments, despite culture and ethnicity being used as an argument against Pakistan by Bengalis during the war. A 1997 peace agreement ended the over twenty-year-long war on autonomy between Bangladesh and the Chittagong Hill Tracts Jumma inhabitants. The Chittagong Hill Tracts showed that only Bengalis were to be beneficiaries of Bengali nationalism and its "liberalism", which was aimed against the hegemony of Pakistan. Even the "pro-minority" and participant of the CHT peace agreement, the Awami League, refused to grant the status of Adibashi, declaring that according to the constitution, Bengali is the nationality and Bangladeshi is the citizenship and refused to acknowledge that Bangladesh had indigenous peoples. Bengali nationalism is part of the BNP's ideology. Jumma nationalism was spawned from Bengali nationalism due to the hegemony exerted by the Bengalis.

Because the Bangladesh independence movement received apathy from the CHT Jummas, they were deemed unfaithful by the Bengalis. The natives of CHT were ignored when the Rangmati Kaptai Dam was financed by the World Bank. No autonomy was awarded to the Chittagong Hill Tracts in the Bangladesh Constitution of 1972. The Chakma conflict is both a religious and ethnic problem in Bangladesh. The Chittagong Hill Tracts saw tribal Chakma leave the area due to religious and ethnic strife caused by Bangladesh's Islamisation policy. The Chittagong Hill Tracts was colonized by Northern Burmese and Bangladeshi Muslims. The label "genocidal" has been used to describe actions by the Bangladeshi government upon the non-Islamic Chittagong Hill Tracts Jumma natives.

In February 1972, Prime Ministers of India and Bangladesh issued a joint statement by virtue of which the Government of India decided to confer citizenship on the Chakmas under Section 5(1)(a) of the Citizenship Act, 1955 but the state of Arunachal Pradesh had reservations. Chakmas were thus allowed to be rehabilitated. The Election Commission of India framed guidelines to enable Chakmas to have the right to vote by having their names enrolled in the electoral rolls of the constituency where they have been settled.

Indian representation 
The Chakmas now have representation in the Mizoram Legislative Assembly, Tripura Legislative Assembly and Tripura Tribal Areas Autonomous District Council. The only seat of political power and identity is the Chakma Autonomous District Council in India, the legitimacy of which is questioned by the Mizo people. There are another 80,000 Chakmas in Rakhine state, Myanmar, who are known as Daingnet people.

In September 2015, the Supreme Court of India passed a judgment directing the Government of India and of Arunachal Pradesh to grant Indian citizenship rights to all of the Chakmas, holding that they cannot be discriminated against any other Indian.

Religion
The Chakmas are followers of Theravada Buddhism, a religion that they have practiced for centuries. Almost every Chakma village has a Buddhist vihar (Ki-yawng or Kaang). Buddhist monks are called bhikkhu or mawichang and chaa-myinì. They preside at religious festivals and ceremonies. The villagers support their monks with food, gifts, and offerings as representatives of the historical Buddha, Gautama or Gotama or Sakyamuni Buddha. Due to religious conversion, there is a significant population of Chakma Christians and Muslims.

According to a 2011 census report, there are 93,411 people who follow Buddhism in Mizoram, India.

Language

The Chakmas originally spoke a language belonging to the Tibeto-Burman family, which belong to the jingpo luish tree. The language was very similar to present day Kachin and Burmese language. But at present days, their language shares many common words or loan words from the Hindi, Pali, Sanskrit, English, Assamese and Bengali languages, due to long years of influence of bengal sultanate. Many linguists now consider the modern Chakma language (known as Changma Bhaz or Changma Hawdha) part of the Eastern Indo-Aryan language group. Changma Bhaz is written in its own script, the Chakma script, also known as Awzhapath/Awjhapat. Chakma is written in an alphabet which allowing for its cursive form, is almost identical with the Khmer and the Lanna (Chiangmai) characters, which was formerly in use in Cambodia, Laos, Thailand and southern parts of Burma.

Culture
]
The Chakmas are people with their own culture, folklore, literature, and traditions. Chakma women wear an ankle length cloth around the waist called a Pinon (pee-nown) and also a Hadi (haa-dee) wrapped above the waist as well as silver ornaments. The pinon (pee-nown) and the Hadi (haa-dee) are colourfuly handwoven with various designs. The design is first embroidered on a piece of cloth known as aalaam.

In the past, most Chakmas practiced slash-and-burn cultivation as their main occupation. However, many Chakmas today have adopted plow cultivation and some have taken up poultry farming.

Traditional temporary homes of the Chakma are called mawnógawr. A mawnógawr is constructed with bamboo and thatch, and supported on wooden logs.

The Chakma tend to mainly cook over an open fire. They eat many types of food (including meats) with rice being a staple, but they usually avoid beef.

Festival

Chakmas celebrate various Buddhist festivals. The most important is Buddha Purnima or internationally known as Vesak. It's also known as Buddha Birthday worldwide. This is the anniversary of three important events in Buddha's life—his birth, his attainment of enlightenment, and his death. It is observed on the full moon day of the month of Vaisakha (usually in May).

On this and other festival days, Chakmas put on their best clothes and visit the temple. There, they offer flowers to the image of Buddha, light candles, and listen to sermons from the priests. Alms (offerings) are given to the poor, and feasts are held for the priests.

The three-day festival known as Biju/Bizu or Chakma New Year, celebrated with much enthusiasm. This Chakma New Year followed same Indian calendar that shares the same date of the New Year. This Biju also celebrated on same date by various Buddhist countries such as Myanmar Sangrai, Thailand Songkran, Cambodia, Laos, India, Bangladesh, Sinhalese New Year and few other Asian countries. Houses are decorated with flowers, young children pay special attention to the elderly to win their blessings, visiting Buddhist monasteries, and preparing festive and traditional Chakma dishes for guests are some of important things.

Bizu 
Bizhu is the most important socio-religious festival of the Chakma. Bizu is a Buddhist festival and public holiday in Tripura.  This festival gave birth to the Bizu dance. The festival lasts for three days and begins one day before the last day of the month of Chaitra, falling in the month of April. The first day is known as Phool Bizu. On this day, household items, clothes are cleaned and washed, food items are collected to give the house a new look with the veil of different flowers.

The second day is known as Mhul Bizu. This day starts with the bath in the river. People wear new clothes and make rounds of the village. Women wear Pinon (pee-nown) and Hadi (Haa-dee) while men wear Silum (see-lhum) and Dudi (du-dee). They also enjoy specially made vegetable curry known as "Paa Zawn Tawn", different homemade sweets like Bawraa-pyi-de, Tsaan-yei pyi-de, Khaw Ga Pyi-de, Beng Pyi-de etc and take part in different traditional sports. The day ends with the Bizu dance.

The last day, which is known as Gawz che Pawz che dyin involves the performances of different socio-religious activities. In the context of its nature, some say that Bizu is a festival, which revolves around agricultural activities because it is celebrated in mid-April when the earth is just drenched with the first rain and the zhum sowing is taken up. And it is believed that with the objective of getting a rich harvest, worship of the earth was arranged, which later on took the form of a festival. However, of late it has lost its agricultural character.

Buddha Purnima 
It is celebrated on the full moon day in the month of Vaisakha. It encompasses the birth, enlightenment (nirvāna), and passing away (Parinirvāna) of Buddha. On the day of the worship, devotees go to the monastery with Shíyong or Qi Yawng (offerings of rice, vegetable and other fruits and confectioneries). The Buddhist monks known as Bhikkhu lead the devotees for the chanting of verses composed in Pali in praise of the holy triple gem: the Buddha, the Dharma (his teachings), and the Sangha (his disciples). Apart from this, other practices such as lighting thousands of lamps and releasing Phanuch Batti (an auspicious lamp made of paper in the form of a balloon) are also done as and when possible.

Food

Bamboo shoots are a traditional dish for the Chakma people, and they call it Bhaz-chuu-ryì. Shrimp paste and fish paste are their traditional ingredients for cooking. They call them Sidol (see-dawl).

The staple food of the Chakmas is rice, supplemented by millet, corn (maize), vegetables, and mustard.  The vegetables include yams, pumpkins, melons, and cucumbers. Vegetables and fruit gathered from the forest may be added to the diet. Fish, poultry, and meat are eaten, despite the fact that many Buddhists are vegetarians.

Some typical Chakma dishes include fish, vegetables, and spices stuffed into a length of bamboo and cooked in a low fire; foods wrapped in banana leaves and placed beside a fire; and eggs that are aged until they get fermented.

Sports and games
Gudu hara, or Ha-do-do, is a game played throughout the Chakma region. Two teams stand on either side of a central line. They take turns sending a player into opposing territory to touch as many people as they can during the space of one breath, while at the same time saying "Ha-do-do." If the player runs out of breath or is caught by their opponents, they are out. On the other hand, if the player successfully returns to their own territory, the players they have tagged must leave the game.

Gyilhei hara is a game that can be played between two teams or two individuals. A special type of seed called gyi-lhei is used to play the game. Gyilhei seeds are found and grown in wild forests of hills and are similar to bean seeds but bigger in size. When the time comes, the large beans dry out and the seeds known as gyilhei are ready to be collected for use in the game.

 Other pastimes include Nadeng Hara, played with a spinning top; and various wrestling games. Pawti hara is a complex traditional game that is played by two teams. Due to how sophisticated its rules are, it is becoming less and less common.

Clans 
Being a Buddhist community they do not have any kind of untouchability. However they are divided into three groups namely Daingnet Sakma, Tongchonga Sakma, Anawkya Sakma. As the population grew they were divided into clans and subclans for smooth administration. According to the Chakma Historians, it is believed that initially they were only divided into 12 Clans(Gawza) in the beginning by the Amu(the head or the ruler). They were as followes:

 Ang-ngu
 Bor-Chege
 Lhak-Sara
 Borbua
 Dhaveng
 Mhulay-Ma
 Bhaw-Gah
 Dharya
 Phaksa
 Chege
 Khuraw-Khuttay
 Tawnnyei.

The King or the Amu divided the Chakma society into Clans as per their ancestor's history and identities. As the population grew the more Clans were added. Chakma Historians now consider they are divided into 46 Gozas i.e Clans. They are as follows:

•Anawkya Sakma

 Ang-ngu
 Bamu
 Barbora
 Baruwa
 Batalayei
 Bawgah
 Bor-Chege
 Bawng/Bung
 Bongzha/Wangzha
 Darjea
 Dawin
 Dhaona
 Dhurjyei
 Hala
 Hangngara 
 Khambei
 Khyang
 Khurs
 Khutus
 Larma
 Leba/Lewa
 Lawkshar
 Muleema
 Muleema-Chege
 Phaksa
 Phe-Dang-Sirri
 Phedungsa
 Phema/Fema
 Phee-Ray-Bangnga
 Phaw
 Pawma
 Rangyelungyei
 Rangyei
 Sadengnga
 Sege/Chege
 Sawkawa/Sekuwa
 Shealyia
 Theyei
 Uksarri
 Aruyai
 Badal
 Bhutamar
 Bola
 Dunyei
 Gokhalyei
 Yi-jae
 Ladeng
 Mangla
 Aungra
 Phuma
 Maungla
 Yi-jae pawza
 Karua

Genetics
The Chakma are strongly related to Tibeto-Burman groups in Northeast India, Southeast Asia and East Asia. According to a genetic study on the population of Bangladesh in 2019, Chakma carried 52.59% Y Haplogroup L, 13.79% haplogroup Q, 10.34% Haplogroup J, 6.03% haplogroup I, 4.31% Haplogroup R1a, 4.31% Haplogroup H, 3.45% Haplogroup G, 1.72% Haplogroup E and 1.72% Haplogroup N.

Notable people

Bangladeshi 
 Amit Chakma, vice-chancellor of the University of Western Australia, Canadian-Bangladeshi 
Trishna Chakma, Bangladeshi former national team football player and captain
 Champa Chakma, former Bangladeshi cricketer 
 Charu Bikash Chakma, Bangladeshi politician 
 Kalparanjan Chakma, Bangladeshi politician 
 Kanak Chanpa Chakma, Bangladeshi artist 
 Ritu Porna Chakma, Bangladeshi footballer 
 Monika Chakma, Bangladeshi footballer 
 Rupna Chakma, Bangladeshi footballer 
 Chandra Kalindi Roy Henriksen, American-Bangladeshi scholar
 Manabendra Narayan Larma, Bangladeshi politician 
 Jyotirindra Bodhipriya Larma, Bangladeshi politician 
 Prajnananda Mahathera, Bangladeshi Buddhist monk
 Benita Roy, Bangladeshi aristocrat, litterateur, diplomat and minister
 Devasish Roy, Bangladeshi politician and lawyer
 Suro Krishna Chakma, Bangladeshi Professional boxer

Indian
 Buddha Dhan Chakma, Indian politician
 Kristo Mohan Chakma, Indian politician
 Nihar Kanti Chakma, Indian politician 
 Nirupam Chakma, Indian politician 
 Rasik Mohan Chakma, Indian politician 
 Sambhu Lal Chakma, Indian singer and politician 
 Santana Chakma, Indian politician
 Ranbir Chakma, Bollywood actor

Pakistani
 Tridev Roy, Pakistani politician, diplomat, writer and 50th raja of Chakma Circle of Bangladesh (born in Bangladesh).

References

Further reading

External links

 
 Interview with the Chakma King

 
 
Adivasi
 
Buddhist communities of Bangladesh
Buddhist communities of India
Buddhist communities of Myanmar
Chittagong Hill Tracts conflict
Ethnic groups in Bangladesh
Ethnic groups in Northeast India
Ethnic groups in South Asia
Ethnic groups in Tripura
History of Chittagong Division
People from Arunachal Pradesh
People from Bandarban District
People from Chittagong Division
.
.
Refugees in India
Scheduled Tribes of Meghalaya
Scheduled Tribes of Mizoram